Shah Rukn-e-Alam Express 
() was a daily express train service between Karachi and Multan in Pakistan. The train named after Shah Rukn-e-Alam, was a saint who lived in Multan.

It had Economy, AC (Air-Conditioned) Lower and AC Parlor class accommodation. It was suspended in February 2011 due to lack of locomotives.

Route 
Karachi to Multan via Hyderabad, Rohri, and Khanpur

References 

Named passenger trains of Pakistan